Johann "Hans" Hindler is an Austrian clarinetist.

Hindler teaches clarinet at the University of Music and Performing Arts in Vienna. He also plays clarinet in the Vienna Philharmonic. Austrian president Thomas Klestil awarded him the Silver Medal of Merit for service to the Republic of Austria in 2004.

References 

Living people
Austrian male musicians
Austrian clarinetists
Players of the Vienna Philharmonic
Musicians from Vienna
21st-century clarinetists
Year of birth missing (living people)